Sivia District is located in the Huanta Province in the Ayacucho Region of Peru. The district was created by "legislative decree" 25845 on November 6, 1992. Its capital, Sivia, is located at an altitude of 551 m.

Capital
Sivia is the capital of the district with a 2010 population of 6,000 inhabitants, according to INEI 2007 Census it had only 3,319 inhabitants, this growth is due to migration receives from the Andean part of the Ayacucho Region those in search of better opportunities for development have been established in the city of Sivia.

Geography 
Other mountains are listed below:

Ethnic groups 
The people in the district are mainly indigenous citizens of Quechua descent. Quechua is the language which the majority of the population (67.11%) learnt to speak in childhood, 32.68% of the residents started speaking using the Spanish language (2007 Peru Census).

References

External links
INEI district information bank